WBOC-TV (channel 16) is a television station in Salisbury, Maryland, United States, affiliated with CBS and Fox. It is the flagship television property of the Milton, Delaware–based Draper Holdings Business Trust, and is co-owned with low-power NBC affiliate WRDE-LD (channel 26) and Telemundo affiliate WBOC-LD (channel 22), as well as eight radio stations. All of the outlets share studios on North Salisbury Boulevard in Salisbury; WBOC-TV maintains secondary studios/office facilities in Milton, Delaware, and transmitter facilities in Laurel, Delaware.

History

WBOC-TV began operations on July 15, 1954, owned originally by Peninsula Broadcasting, which started WBOC radio (960 AM, now WTGM and 104.7 FM, now WQHQ), the first successful radio station on the Eastern Shore, in 1940. It is the fourth-oldest television station in Maryland, the first outside Baltimore, and the oldest in Maryland on the UHF band.

It was originally an affiliate of the DuMont Television Network. However, around 1955, it picked up a primary affiliation with CBS, relegating DuMont to secondary status until that network shut down in 1956. It also picked up secondary affiliations with NBC and ABC. The station also featured local programming consisting of variety shows, talent contests, and children's programs.

In 1961, Peninsula Broadcasting was acquired by the A. S. Abell Company, which published the Baltimore Sun and owned Baltimore's then-CBS affiliate, WMAR-TV. WBOC-TV gradually increased the CBS programming on its schedule, though it continued to "cherry-pick" the highest-rated ABC and NBC shows either in pattern (on schedule with the rest of the network) or on a tape-delayed basis.

For example, channel 16 regularly carried the Today Show and The Tonight Show from NBC, and weekend sports coverage from all three networks. Prime time programming consisted of at least one night of all CBS; other evenings with programs from both CBS and ABC; and others with shows from CBS and NBC. Select CBS programs displaced by the scheduling method would air in times outside of prime time. Despite carrying Today (which preempted CBS' numerous attempts at morning news programming and Captain Kangaroo), WBOC-TV aired all of CBS's other newscasts, as well as most of CBS's daytime programming and Saturday morning cartoons. The cherry-picking arrangement also affected prime time network sports coverage. However, Delmarva viewers didn't have to worry about missing their favorite shows once cable came to the area. Local cable systems on the Maryland side of the market supplemented the area with the Baltimore stations, while cable systems in Sussex County supplemented it with the Philadelphia stations.

Although it primarily serves a relatively small market of roughly 209,000 people, channel 16 has substantial viewership in portions of three neighboring markets. Kent County, Delaware, home to Dover, is part of the Philadelphia market. However, WBOC-TV has long claimed Dover as part of its primary coverage area, and it has been available for decades on cable there, though presently only in digital. Not only does WBOC-TV operate a bureau there, but for many years it identified as "Salisbury/Dover." Accomack County, Virginia is part of the Hampton Roads market, and is primarily served by county-owned translators of the Hampton Roads stations. WBOC-TV has long been available on cable in Accomack County, alongside the Hampton Roads stations. The station also covers the five Eastern Shore counties that are part of the Baltimore market.

In April 1980, WBOC-TV received competition for the first time when WMDT (channel 47) signed on as a dual ABC/NBC affiliate, allowing channel 16 to become a full-time CBS station. In November of that same year, local ownership of channel 16 returned when entrepreneur Thomas H. Draper purchased the station. Since Draper took over, local news coverage increased, as well as local advertising revenue which allowed for technical upgrades, such as a new four-million-watt tower located near Laurel, Delaware. WBOC-TV regained a sister radio station in 2015, when Draper acquired WOLC (102.5 FM) in Princess Anne and relaunched it as WBOC-FM (the original WBOC radio stations had been sold to separate interests in 1980).

DT2 subchannel
On March 3, 2003, WBOC launched a subchannel to be the area's UPN affiliate, known on-air as "UPN21 Total TV". Before then, either the network's Baltimore affiliates (first WNUV, and later WUTB) or WDCA in Washington, D.C. had been provided on cable systems on the Maryland side of the market, while WPSG in Philadelphia had served the Delaware side, and WGNT in Portsmouth on the Virginia side.

On May 9, 2006, WBOC announced that the subchannel would become a Fox affiliate beginning August 21; UPN was in the process of shutting down as part of a merger with The WB to form The CW, but the Delmarva rights to the new network went to a subchannel of WMDT. For Fox's first 20 years of existence, either WBFF in Baltimore or network-owned WTTG in Washington, D.C. had served as the network's default affiliates for the Maryland side of the market, while affiliate-turned-O&O WTXF-TV in Philadelphia served the Delaware side, and the network's Hampton Roads affiliates were carried on the Virginia side (WTVZ-TV until August 1998, then WVBT).

Local programming
Syndicated programming on WBOC-TV's main channel includes Live with Kelly and Ryan, The Drew Barrymore Show, Entertainment Tonight, Inside Edition, and Jeopardy!; the latter two shows also air on sister station WRDE-LD. Syndicated programming on WBOC-DT2 includes Rachael Ray, The Doctors, The Real, Judge Mathis, The People's Court, 25 Words or Less, Extra, and TMZ on TV; the latter also includes its live counterpart.

Newscasts

WBOC operates a bureau in Milton, Delaware, in addition to its main studios in Salisbury. All news broadcasts can be seen via live streaming video on WBOC's Facebook page and mobile app.

When WBOC-DT2 became a Fox affiliate, the main channel began producing local news weeknights at 5 for a half-hour (known as WBOC News at 5 on Fox 21) and every night at 10 also for thirty minutes (called WBOC News at 10 on Fox 21). Both shows air from a secondary set and feature a separate graphics package. Weekday mornings at 6, this station simulcasts the second hour of the main channel's weekday morning show.

On August 26, 2008, WBOC began airing its local newscasts in high definition from a newly constructed addition to its studios known as the "NewsPlex". Since WBOC-DT2 airs in standard definition, its shows can only be seen in HD on Verizon FiOS, Comcast digital systems, and DirecTV. In addition to the main facilities in Salisbury, the station operates Delaware bureaus in Dover (in the Rodney Village section on US 13/South Dupont Highway) and Milton (at The Square in a facility that also houses sister station WRDE-LD's news studio).

Non-news programming
WBOC produces a daily talk show called DelmarvaLife and an outdoors program Outdoors Delmarva, which broadcasts on Saturdays.

Notable former on-air staff
 Hallie Jackson, now NBC News Senior Washington Correspondent
 Weijia Jiang, now CBS News Senior White House Correspondent
 Oren Liebermann, now CNN Pentagon Correspondent
 Mike Seidel, now at The Weather Channel
 Amber Theoharis, now a reporter for NFL Network
 Gary Tuchman, now CNN Correspondent for Anderson Cooper 360

Technical information

Subchannels
The station's digital signal is multiplexed:

A standard definition simulcast of WBOC's Telemundo Delmarva replaced the over the air broadcast of WBOC Classics in November 2017.  On August 13, 2018, WBOC Classics returned over the air on WBOC. On July 26, 2021, WBOC Classics moved to WBOC-LD after WBOC-DT2 was upgraded to 720p high definition. On February 7, 2022, Delmarva Sports Network launched on 16.2, broadcasting games of local high school and college teams.

Analog-to-digital conversion
WBOC-TV discontinued regular programming on its analog signal, over UHF channel 16, on June 12, 2009, the official date in which full-power television stations in the United States transitioned from analog to digital broadcasts under federal mandate. The station's digital signal remained on its pre-transition UHF channel 21, using PSIP to display the station's virtual channel as its former UHF analog channel 16.

Unlike most digital subchannels, WBOC-DT2 is one of the few that identifies with its physical digital channel number (21) rather than a virtual channel (16.2) through PSIP. The subchannel is known on-air as Fox 21 Delmarva.

On August 1, 2019, WBOC-TV moved from digital UHF channel 21 to UHF channel 32 as part of the FCC repack. Despite the move, the Fox subchannel continues to use 21 in its branding and virtual channel number.

Cable and satellite availability
Since November 2010, WBOC and Fox 21 have been available on DirecTV and Dish Network in their primary five-county coverage area. For WBOC viewers outside this area, satellite subscribers may request a waiver to receive New York City stations if they can't pick up the Delmarva stations over the air. Before 2010, Delmarva was one of the few markets where local stations weren't available on satellite.

From the 1970s to the 1980s, WBOC was carried on cable as far north as Cape May County, New Jersey and New Castle County, Delaware and as far south as Northampton County, Virginia.

Carriage disputes
On July 23, 2014, DirecTV announced it was in a carriage dispute Draper Holdings, owner of WBOC-TV. It was announced that if Draper and DirecTV could not reach a fair deal before July 31, 2014, DirecTV would no longer be permitted to carry Draper Holdings' stations. WBOC and Fox 21 said they were asking for far less money than what DirecTV pays for national networks like ESPN—even though they claim their combined ratings are much higher than ESPN's ratings. DirecTV stated Draper wants seven times more in their new contract. On August 1, DirecTV and Draper Holdings reached a settlement, and the channels remain on the air with no blackouts.

On October 1, 2017, Verizon FiOS dropped WBOC from its lineup. Verizon claimed WBOC was demanding a 175% rate increase.  WBOC was restored to the Verizon lineup on November 20, 2017.

References

External links

 
 Fox 21 website

CBS network affiliates
Fox network affiliates
Television channels and stations established in 1954
1954 establishments in Maryland
BOC-TV
BOC-TV